Target for Terror is a Nancy Drew and Hardy Boys Supermystery crossover novel. It was published by Pocket Books in 1995.

Plot summary
Tim An, the president of Philonesia, a small country in the midst of crisis, requests the help of Nancy Drew to prevent his daughter Soong An from being kidnapped. She is a gifted violinist and a student at San Francisco University. Meanwhile, the Hardy Boys are at the university undercover as student activists in Ethics Now, a group protesting experiments conducted on animals, investigating the possibility that the group is responsible for attacks on university laboratories. Confronting such factors as jealousy, rage, chaos, and sabotage, the triple threat must resolve the conflict, and end the confusion.

References

External links
Target for Terror at Fantastic Fiction
Supermystery series books

Supermystery
1995 American novels
1995 children's books
Novels set in San Francisco
Novels about terrorism